The Journal of Risk and Insurance is a quarterly peer-reviewed academic journal covering insurance economics and risk management. The journal is published by Wiley on behalf of the American Risk and Insurance Association. The current editor-in-chief is Joan T. Schmit (University of Wisconsin-Madison). The journal was established in 1933 as the Proceedings of the Annual Meeting (American Association of University Teachers of Insurance) and renamed Journal of The American Association of University Teachers of Insurance in 1937. From 1954 until 1956 it was known as The Review of Insurance Studies and from 1957 to 1963 as The Journal of Insurance, before obtaining its current title.

Abstracting and indexing
The journal is abstracted and indexed in the Social Sciences Citation Index, the Economic Literature Index, Scopus, InfoTrac, RePEc, and other databases. According to the Journal Citation Reports, the journal has a 2020 impact factor of 1.803.

References

External links

Publications established in 1933
English-language journals
Wiley (publisher) academic journals
Business and management journals
Quarterly journals